Santiago Castellanos (born 7 July 1977) is a Spanish former swimmer who competed in the 2000 Summer Olympics.

References

1977 births
Living people
Spanish male breaststroke swimmers
Olympic swimmers of Spain
Swimmers at the 2000 Summer Olympics